The 2022–23 All-Ireland Junior B Club Hurling Championship was the 17th staging of the All-Ireland Junior B Club Hurling Championship since its establishment by the Killeedy GAA Club in 2005. The draw for the provincial championships took place on 28 October 2022. The championship ran from 19 November 2022 to 25 February 2023.

The All-Ireland final was played on 25 February 2023 at Páirc Íde Naofa between Sarsfields from Galway and Bruff from Limerick, in what was their first-ever meeting in the final. Sarsfields won the match by 1-09 to 0-09 to claim their first ever All-Ireland title.

Leinster Junior B Club Hurling Championship

Leinster preliminary round

Leinster quarter-finals

Leinster semi-finals

Leinster final

Munster Junior B Club Hurling Championship

Munster quarter-finals

Munster semi-finals

Munster final

All-Ireland Junior B Club Hurling Championship

All-Ireland semi-finals

All-Ireland final

References

All-Ireland Junior B Club Hurling Championship
All-Ireland Junior B Club Hurling Championship
All-Ireland Junior Club Hurling Championship